Blood in the Water is a television film that aired on the Discovery Channel in 2009. It was directed by Richard Bedser. It is based on a true-life series of shark attacks that became the inspiration for Peter Benchley's novel Jaws. It was the season premiere of Shark Week on August 2 for the 2009 season.

Plot
Blood in the Water tells the story of a series of shark attacks, that occurred on the New Jersey shore during the summer of 1916. Five people were attacked over the course of 12 days. The Jersey Shore attacks triggered a nationwide panic. It also details how scientists views on sharks and the threat they posed to humans changed in the wake of the attacks.

References

External links
 

2009 television films
2009 films
2009 horror films
American horror television films
Films about shark attacks
Films set in New Jersey
Films about sharks
Films set in 1916
2000s American films